The United Nations Security Council Resolution 2204 was unanimously adopted by the Security Council on 24 February 2015. The resolution extended sanctions on individuals threatening the stability of Yemen and extended the mandate of the Panel of Experts on Yemen for one year.

See also 

 List of United Nations Security Council Resolutions 2201 to 2300
 List of United Nations Security Council resolutions concerning Yemen

References

External links 

 Resolution at undocs.org

 2204
 2204
2015 in Yemen